Creagris is a genus of beetles in the family Carabidae, containing the following species:

 Creagris bigemmis Andrewes, 1931
 Creagris binoculus Bates, 1892
 Creagris bisignata Landin, 1955
 Creagris distracta (Wiedemann, 1823)
 Creagris hamaticollis Bates, 1892
 Creagris labrosa Nietner, 1857
 Creagris lineola Andrewes, 1926
 Creagris rubrothorax Louwerens, 1949
 Creagris wilsonii (Castelnau, 1867)

References

Anthiinae (beetle)
Taxa named by John Nietner